Sir William Hamilton, 9th Baronet FRSE (8 March 1788 – 6 May 1856) was a Scottish metaphysician. He is often referred to as William Stirling Hamilton of Preston, in reference to his mother, Elizabeth Stirling.

Early life
He was born in rooms at the University of Glasgow, He was from an academic family: his father Professor William Hamilton, had in 1781, on the recommendation of William Hunter, been appointed to succeed his own father, Dr Thomas Hamilton, as Regius Professor of Anatomy, Glasgow; he died in 1790, aged 32. William Hamilton and his younger brother, Thomas Hamilton, were brought up by their mother.

Hamilton received his early education at Glasgow Grammar School, except for two years which he spent in a private school at Chiswick in Kent, and in 1807 went as a Snell Exhibitioner, to Balliol College, Oxford. He obtained a first class in literis humanioribus and took his BA in 1811 (MA 1814). He had been intended for the medical profession, but soon after leaving Oxford he gave up this idea, and in 1813 became a member of the Scottish bar, as a qualified advocate. 

Hamilton's life continued to be that of a student, while he was gradually forming his philosophic system. Investigation enabled him to make good his claim to represent the ancient family of Hamilton of Preston, and in 1816 he took up its baronetcy, which had been in abeyance since the death of Sir Robert Hamilton of Preston (1650–1701).

Early time as philosopher
Two visits to Germany in 1817 and 1820 led to William's taking up the study of German and later on that of contemporary German philosophy, which was almost entirely neglected in British universities. In 1820 he was a candidate for the chair of moral philosophy in the University of Edinburgh, which had fallen vacant on the death of Thomas Brown, colleague of Dugald Stewart, and Stewart's consequent resignation, however he was defeated on political grounds by John Wilson, (1785–1854), the "Christopher North" of Blackwood's Magazine. In 1821 he was appointed professor of civil history, and delivered several courses of lectures on the history of modern Europe and the history of literature. The salary was £100 a year, derived from a local beer tax, and was discontinued after a time. No pupils were compelled to attend, the class dwindled, and Hamilton gave it up when the salary ceased. In January 1827 his mother, to whom he had been devoted, died. In March 1828 he married his cousin, Janet Marshall.

Around this time he moved to live in a recently built townhouse at 11 Manor Place, in Edinburgh's west end.

Publications

In 1829 his career of authorship began with the appearance of the well-known essay on the "Philosophy of the Unconditioned" (a critique of Victor Cousin's Cours de philosophie)–the first of a series of articles contributed by him to the Edinburgh Review. He was elected in 1836 to the University of Edinburgh chair of logic and metaphysics, and from this time dates the influence which, during the next 20 years, he exerted over the thought of the younger generation in Scotland. Much about the same time he began the preparation of an annotated edition of Thomas Reid's works, intending to annex to it a number of dissertations. However before this design had been carried out, he was struck, in 1844, with paralysis of the right side which seriously crippled his bodily powers, though left his mind unimpaired.

The edition of Reid appeared in 1846, but with only seven of the intended dissertations, one unfinished. At his death he had still not completed the work; notes on the subjects to be discussed were found among his manuscripts. Considerably earlier, he had formed his theory of logic, the leading principles of which were indicated in the prospectus of "an essay on a new analytic of logical forms" prefixed to his edition of Reid. But the elaboration of the scheme in its details and applications continued during the next few years to occupy much of his leisure. Out of this arose a sharp controversy with Augustus De Morgan. The essay did not appear, but the results of the labour gone through are contained in the appendices to his Lectures on Logic. Hamilton had also drawn from the works of Wilhelm Esser in his explanation of laws in the language of agency. For instance, he cited Esser's definition of universal law, to explain the sense or "quality" of "necessary".

Hamilton also prepared extensive materials for a publication which he designed on the personal history, influence and opinions of Martin Luther. Here he advanced so far as to have planned and partly carried out the arrangement of the work; but it did not go further, and still remains in manuscript. In 1852–1853 appeared the first and second editions of his Discussions in Philosophy, Literature and Education, a reprint, with large additions, of his contributions to the Edinburgh Review. Soon after, his general health began to fail. Assisted by his devoted wife, he persevered in literary labour; and during 1854–1855 he brought out nine volumes of a new edition of Stewart's works. The only remaining volume was to have contained a memoir of Stewart, but this he did not live to write. Hamilton was elected a Foreign Honorary Member of the American Academy of Arts and Sciences in 1855. He taught his class for the last time in the winter of 1855–1856. Shortly after the close of the session he was taken ill, and died in Edinburgh.

Death

He died on 6 May 1856 and was buried in St John's Episcopal Churchyard at the east end of Princes Street in Edinburgh. The stone is not in its original location and is used to edge the enclosure at the east end of the church.

He had married Janet, the daughter of Hubert Marshall, and was succeeded by his son Sir William Stirling-Hamilton, 10th Baronet, a general in the British Army.

Place in thought
In 1840 the University of Leyden granted him an honorary Doctor of Divinity (DD), a rarity for persons outwith the clergy.

Hamilton's positive contribution to the progress of thought is comparatively slight, but he stimulated a spirit of criticism in his pupils by insisting on the great importance of psychology as opposed to the older metaphysical method, and by his recognition of the importance of German philosophy, especially that of Immanuel Kant. By far his most important work was "Philosophy of the Unconditioned," the development of the principle that for the human finite mind there can be no knowledge of the Infinite. The basis of his argument is the thesis, "To think is to condition." Deeply impressed with Kant's antithesis between subject and object, the knowing and the known, Hamilton laid down the principle that every object is known only in virtue of its relations to other objects. From this it follows that limitless time, space, power, etc., are inconceivable. The fact, however, that all thought seems to demand the idea of the infinite or absolute provides a sphere for faith, which is thus the specific faculty of theology. It is a weakness characteristic of the human mind that it cannot conceive any phenomenon without a beginning: hence the conception of the causal relation, according to which every phenomenon has its cause in preceding phenomena, and its effect in subsequent phenomena. The causal concept is, therefore, only one of the ordinary necessary forms of the cognitive consciousness limited, as we have seen, by being confined to that which is relative.

As regards the problem of the nature of objectivity, Hamilton simply accepts the evidence of consciousness as to the separate existence of the object: "the root of our nature cannot be a lie." In virtue of this assumption Hamilton's philosophy becomes a "natural realism." In fact his whole position is a strange compound of Kant and Reid. Its chief practical corollary is the denial of philosophy as a method of attaining absolute knowledge and its relegation to the academic sphere of mental training. The transition from philosophy to theology, i.e. to the sphere of faith, is presented by Hamilton under the analogous relation between the mind and the body. As the mind is to the body, so is the unconditioned Absolute or God to the world of the conditioned. Consciousness, itself a conditioned phenomenon, must derive from or depend on some different thing prior to or behind material phenomena. Curiously enough, however, Hamilton does not explain how it comes about that God, who in the terms of the analogy bears to the conditioned mind the relation which the conditioned mind bears to its objects, can be unconditioned. God can be regarded only as related to consciousness, and insofar is, therefore, not absolute or unconditioned. Thus the very principles of Hamilton's philosophy are apparently violated in his theological argument.

Hamilton regarded logic as a purely formal science; it seemed to him an unscientific mixing together of heterogeneous elements to treat as parts of the same science the formal and the material conditions of knowledge. He was quite ready to allow that on this view logic cannot be used as a means of discovering or guaranteeing facts, even the most general, and expressly asserted that it has to do, not with the objective validity, but only with the mutual relations, of judgments. He further held that induction and deduction are correlative processes of formal logic, each resting on the necessities of thought and deriving thence its several laws. The only logical laws which he recognised were the three axioms of identity, noncontradiction, and excluded middle, which he regarded as severally phases of one general condition of the possibility of existence and, therefore, of thought. The law of reason and consequent he considered not as different, but merely as expressing metaphysically what these express logically. He added as a postulate—which in his theory was of importance--"that logic be allowed to state explicitly what is thought implicitly." in logic, Hamilton is known chiefly as the inventor of the doctrine of the "quantification of the predicate," i.e. that the judgment "All A is B " should really mean "All A is all B," whereas the ordinary universal proposition should be stated "All A is some B." This view, which was supported by Stanley Jevons, is fundamentally at fault since it implies that the predicate is thought of in its extension; in point of fact when a judgment is made, e.g. about men, that they are mortal ("All men are mortal"), the intention is to attribute a quality (i.e. the predicate is used in connotation). In other words, we are not considering the question "what kind are men among the various things which must die?" (as is implied in the form "all men are some mortals") but "what is the fact about men?" We are not stating a mere identity (see further, e.g., H. W. B. Joseph, Introduction to Logic, 1906, pp. 198 foll.).

The philosopher to whom above all others Hamilton professed allegiance was Aristotle. His works were the object of his profound and constant study, and supplied in fact the mould in which his whole philosophy was cast. With the commentators on the Aristotelian writings, ancient, medieval and modern, he was also familiar; and the scholastic philosophy he studied with care and appreciation at a time when it had hardly yet begun to attract attention in his country. His wide reading enabled him to trace many a doctrine to the writings of forgotten thinkers; and nothing gave him greater pleasure than to draw forth such from their obscurity, and to give due acknowledgment, even if it chanced to be of the prior possession of a view or argument that he had thought out for himself. Of modern German philosophy he was a diligent, if not always a sympathetic, student. How profoundly his thinking was modified by that of Kant is evident from the tenor of his speculations; nor was this less the case because, on fundamental points, he came to widely different conclusions.

Hamilton was more than a philosopher; his knowledge and interests embraced all subjects related to that of the human mind. He studied anatomy and physiology. He was also well-read in ancient and modern literature, being particularly interested in the 16th and 17th centuries. Among his literary projects were editions of the works of George Buchanan and Julius Caesar Scaliger. His general scholarship found expression in his library, which became part of the library of the University of Glasgow.

He also may have had influence upon subsequent philosophy as the inspiration for a critique by John Stuart Mill which resulted in perhaps the clearest statements ever of the idea of matter as the permanent possibility of sensation.

Education
His chief practical interest was in education—an interest which he manifested alike as a teacher and as a writer, and which had led him long before he was either to a study of the subject both theoretical and historical. He thence adopted views as to the ends and methods of education that, when afterwards carried out or advocated by him, met with general recognition; but he also expressed in one of his articles an unfavourable view of the study of mathematics as a mental gymnastic, which excited much opposition, but which he never saw reason to alter. As a teacher, he was zealous and successful, and his writings on university organisation and reform had, at the time of their appearance, a decisive practical effect, and contain much that is of permanent value.

Last works
His posthumous works are his Lectures on Metaphysics and Logic (1860), 4 vols., edited by HL Mansel, Oxford, and John Veitch (Metaphysics; Logic); and Additional Notes to Reid's Works, from Sir W. Hamilton's Manuscripts., under the editorship of HL Mansel, D.D. (1862). A Memoir of Sir W. Hamilton, by Veitch, appeared in 1869. Philosophy (1873).

References

Further reading
 Hamilton by John Veitch (1882)

External links
 
 
 

1788 births
1856 deaths
19th-century British philosophers
Baronets in the Baronetage of Nova Scotia
Doctors of Divinity
Scottish philosophers
Writers from Glasgow
Alumni of Balliol College, Oxford
Academics of the University of Edinburgh
Fellows of the American Academy of Arts and Sciences
Metaphysicians
Scottish logicians
Scottish knights
19th-century Scottish writers
Burials at St John's, Edinburgh